Alcohol (foaled 16 September 2008) is a retired Australian Thoroughbred racehorse who was trained by Richard Jolly at Morphettville in South Australia.
Sporting blue silks with a pink fleurs-de-lys and yellow sleeves, Alcohol was a favourite with the punters in South Australia.

Breeding
He was foaled in Australia at Lauriston Thoroughbred Farm, Corinella, Victoria.

Racing career
The current racing record of Alcohol is 25 starts for 6 wins, 4 seconds and 6 thirds for earnings of A$323,630.

Two-year-old season
Alcohol started racing as a two-year-old on 20 July 2011 in a race at Balaklava, finishing 3rd, prior to spelling.

Three-year-old season
Alcohol continued his racing career as a three-year-old, and broke his maiden with a win on his 5th race at Moonee Valley Racecourse on 16 December 2011, and competed in Group 1 South Australian Derby on 5 May 2012.

Four-year-old season
Alcohol commenced his four-year-old season winning 3 out of his first 4 starts, with a first up win on the Morpettville Parks track on 27 October 2012, and continued on by travelling to Victoria to win at Flemington on 15 December 2012.

Five-year-old season
Alcohol was only lightly raced as a five-year-old, running only 2 races after a lengthy spell.

Six-year-old season
Returning at Morphettville over 1200m, he returned to the winner circle in his first up race back.

Race record

Pedigree

References

External links 
 Racing Information Services Australia
 Alcohol's Racing profile
 Registrar Information

2008 racehorse births
Racehorses bred in Australia